This is a list of winners and nominees of the Primetime Emmy Award for Outstanding Supporting Actor in a Comedy Series. In early Primetime Emmy Award ceremonies, the supporting categories were not always genre, or even gender, specific. Beginning with the 22nd Primetime Emmy Awards, supporting actors in comedy have competed alone. However, these comedic performances often included actors from miniseries, telefilms, and guest performers competing against main cast competitors. Such instances are marked below:

 # – Indicates a performance in a Miniseries or Television film, prior to the category's creation
 § – Indicates a performance as a guest performer, prior to the category's creation

Winners and nominations

1950s

1960s

1970s

1980s

1990s

2000s

2010s

2020s

Superlatives

Programs with multiple wins

5 wins
 The Andy Griffith Show (3 consecutive), (2 consecutive) 
 The Mary Tyler Moore Show (3 consecutive), (2 consecutive)

4 wins
 Frasier (2 consecutive)
 Modern Family (3 consecutive)
 Night Court (consecutive)

3 wins
 Entourage (consecutive)
 Everybody Loves Raymond (2 consecutive)
 Taxi (consecutive)
 Seinfeld (2 consecutive)

2 wins
 All in the Family
 Caesar's Hour (consecutive)
 Hogan's Heroes (consecutive) 
 The Jackie Gleason Show (consecutive)
 M*A*S*H
 Ted Lasso (consecutive)
 Veep

Programs with multiple nominations

21 nominations
 M*A*S*H

19 nominations
 Cheers
 Modern Family

13 nominations
 Everybody Loves Raymond
 Frasier
 The Mary Tyler Moore Show

12 nominations
 Seinfeld

10 nominations
 The Larry Sanders Show
 Saturday Night Live

8 nominations
 Barney Miller
 Veep

7 nominations
 Entourage
 Ted Lasso
 Will & Grace

6 nominations
 Barry
 Newhart
 Taxi
 Two and a Half Men

5 nominations
 The Andy Griffith Show
 All in the Family
 Evening Shade
 Hogan's Heroes
 I Love Lucy
 The Marvelous Mrs. Maisel

4 nominations
 Ally McBeal
 Brooklyn Nine-Nine
 Coach
 How I Met Your Mother
 Night Court
 The Phil Silvers Show
 Unbreakable Kimmy Schmidt

3 nominations
 Arrested Development
 Baskets
 Caesar's Hour
 Girls
 The Jackie Gleason Show
 The Kominsky Method
 Malcolm in the Middle
 Murphy Brown
 The Office

2 nominations
 30 Rock
 Ben Casey
 Dragnet
 Glee
 Key & Peele
 The Lucy Show
 Room 222
 The Steve Allen Show
 WKRP in Cincinnati

Performers with multiple wins

5 wins
 Don Knotts (3 consecutive, then 2 consecutive)

4 wins
 John Larroquette (consecutive)
 David Hyde Pierce (2 consecutive)

3 wins
 Ed Asner (2 consecutive)
 Art Carney (consecutive)
 Brad Garrett (2 consecutive)
 Jeremy Piven (consecutive)
 Michael Richards (2 consecutive)

2 wins
 Ty Burrell
 Brett Goldstein (consecutive)
 Tony Hale
 Werner Klemperer (consecutive)
 Ted Knight
 Christopher Lloyd (consecutive)
 Carl Reiner (consecutive)
 Rob Reiner
 Eric Stonestreet

Performers with multiple nominations

11 nominations
 David Hyde Pierce

9 nominations
 Harry Morgan

8 nominations
 Ty Burrell

7 nominations
 Jason Alexander
 Ed Asner
 Peter Boyle
 Gary Burghoff
 Sean Hayes

6 nominations
 Jon Cryer
 Tony Hale
 Ted Knight
 Jeffrey Tambor
 Rip Torn
 George Wendt

5 nominations
 Jesse Tyler Ferguson
 William Frawley
 Brad Garrett
 Woody Harrelson
 Werner Klemperer
 Don Knotts
 Rob Reiner
 Michael Richards

4 nominations
 Andre Braugher
 Tituss Burgess
 Art Carney
 Danny DeVito
 Paul Ford
 Gale Gordon
 Neil Patrick Harris
 John Larroquette
 Jeremy Piven
 Tom Poston
 Carl Reiner
 Tony Shalhoub
 Jerry Van Dyke

3 nominations
 Louie Anderson
 Nicholas Colasanto
 Bryan Cranston
 Kevin Dillon
 Adam Driver
 Michael Jeter
 Steve Landesberg
 Peter MacNicol
 Ed O'Neill
 Peter Scolari
 McLean Stevenson
 Eric Stonestreet
 Kenan Thompson
 Rainn Wilson
 Henry Winkler

2 nominations
 Alan Arkin
 Alec Baldwin
 Anthony Carrigan
 Chris Colfer
 Michael Constantine
 Charles Durning
 Max Gail
 Brett Goldstein
 Kelsey Grammer
 Bill Hader
 Howard Hesseman
 Keegan-Michael Key
 Christopher Lloyd
 John Mahoney
 Nick Mohammed
 John Ratzenberger
 David Ogden Stiers
 Abe Vigoda
 Matt Walsh
 Bowen Yang

See also
 Primetime Emmy Award for Outstanding Supporting Actor in a Drama Series
 Golden Globe Award for Best Supporting Actor – Series, Miniseries or Television Film

Notes

References

Supporting Actor - Comedy Series
 
Emmy Award